Constantina is the feminine form of Constantine. It may refer to:

 Constantina, a Byzantine saint, the eldest daughter of Roman Emperor Constantine I and his second wife Fausta
 Constantina (empress), Byzantine empress, daughter of Tiberius II and wife of Maurice
 Constantina, Brazil, a Brazilian municipality in Rio Grande do Sul
 Constantina, Seville, a Spanish municipality in the province of Seville.
 Constantina (Osrhoene), a Roman/Byzantine city in northern Mesopotamia

See also 
Constantine (disambiguation)